Yoo Dong-kwan (Korean: 유동관; born May 12, 1963) is a South Korean former footballer who played as a midfielder.

He started his professional career at POSCO Atoms in 1986.

He was winner of K League Best XI in 1993 K League.

References

External links 
 

1963 births
Living people
Association football midfielders
Pohang Steelers players
South Korean footballers
Hanyang University alumni
Place of birth missing (living people)